Beketovo is a rural locality (a selo) and the administrative centre of Beketovsky Selsoviet, Yermekeyevsky District, Bashkortostan, Russia. The population was 477 as of 2010. There are 7 streets.

Geography 
Beketovo is located 25 km southeast of Yermekeyevo (the district's administrative centre) by road. Priyutovo is the nearest rural locality.

References 

Rural localities in Yermekeyevsky District